The short worm lizard (Pachycalamus brevis) is a species of reptile in the Trogonophidae family. It is monotypic within the genus Pachycalamus. It is found on the island of Socotra.

References 

 Gans, C. (2005). CHECKLIST AND BIBLIOGRAPHY of the AMPHISBAENIA OF THE WORLD. Bull. Am. Mus. Nat. Hist. 289: 1-130
 Günther, A. (1881). Descriptions of the amphisbaenians and ophidians collected by Prof. J.B. Balfour in the Island of Socotra. Proc. Zool. Soc. London 1881: 461-463
 Rösler, H. 1999. Pachycalamus brevis GÜNTHER 1881 - Biologie und erste Eindrücke einer Terrarienhaltung. Elaphe 7 (1): 19-21
 Rösler, H. & Wranik, W. 2004. A key and annotated checklist to the reptiles of the Socotra archipelago. Fauna of Arabia 20: 505-534

External links
 Worldwildlife.org
 Pachycalamus in the Reptile Database

Trogonophidae
Endemic fauna of Socotra
Reptiles described in 1881
Taxa named by Albert Günther